Death Bell 2: Bloody Camp is a 2010 Korean slasher film. It was directed by Yoo Sun-dong and is a sequel to the 2008 film Death Bell. The story is unrelated to the previous film. The film was also pre-sold in Taiwan and Hong Kong for $230,000 at the 63rd Cannes International Film Festival Film Market.

Plot

This film is about a group of high school students and teachers who are locked in the school after the swimming instructor is murdered. In South Korea, the high school student and swimmer Jeong Tae-yeon (Yoon Seung-ah) is found dead in the pool, apparently a suicide. Two years later, teacher Park Eun-su (Hwang Jung-eum) joins the high school, where Tae-yeon's stepsister Lee Se-Hee (Park Ji-yeon) is haunted by nightmarish visions and is bullied by the student Eom Ji-yun (Choi Ah-jin). Eun-su finds it difficult to earn respect in the classroom and is backed up by an older teacher, Cha (Kim Su-ro). Se-Hee and her classmates are selected for an elite "study camp" held at the school during the summer break where 30 students study for their university entrance exams. The school's swimming trainer is murdered in the showers and the words "When an innocent mother is killed, what son would not avenge her death?" are found scrawled on a blackboard. A voice warns the students that they will all be killed unless they can answer who is the murderer and why. The students and teachers find they are locked in the school when more deaths begin to happen.

Several student died of various causes, mainly by brutal murder. Mr. Cha was kidnapped by an unknown figure and trapped in an activated dryer with the temperature increasing rapidly. The students tried to save the teacher by inputting the correct password phrases for the dryer with hints from various photographs. As they almost succeed the fire broke out, causing Mr. Cha to be incinerated and to explode due to the heat, panicking the students.

After failing to rescue their teacher, a student notices Ji-yun disappeared. Actually, Ji-yun escapes the site and confesses her sins to Eun-su. In the past, several student made a study group, but at some point it nearly degenerated, and JK provoked Soo-il to commit sexual violence against Tae-yeon. She resisted heavily but Eom Ji-yun smashed her head on a water tap in shower room, leading to her death. Her boyfriend Jung-bum realized this, but the students tried to cover up their criminal act as they were concerned about the humiliation of their alma mater and own honor. The students falsely accused Jung-bum of the accident, leading him to be put in mental facilities. This made him and his sister Eun-su, covertly plan and commit the serial murders against the students.

Then, Eun-su orders the students to gather in auditorium, where Ji-yun is trapped and prepared to be hanged by noose, and the key for safe containing the cell phone is connected to her. In order to call any help through the cell phone, they should sacrifice her by pulling keys, opening the safe and making the call in ten minutes. They fight for the call despite Ji-yun's heavy resistance but several seconds after the cell phone goes out of range, the call has been disconnected with Ji-yun hanged.

Later, Jung-bum sets the school on fire. Kwan-woo devised the idea to escape. He puts a butane cylinder against the other students to escape, but he realizes Se-hee is not there, so he heads to swimming room. Jung-bum arrives at the site as well and with Se-hee, they push themselves into the pool to be drowned in order to avenge her because she turned away the accident and acted as bystander. Se-hee tried to break the chain to no avail, leaving only her to be drowned. However, the ghost of Tae-yeon appears and released her from the chain, bringing her back to life through CPR done by Kwan-woo and Na-rae. Tae-yeon and Jung-bum slowly disappear through the darkness in the swimming pool.

Cast
Yoon Shi-yoon as Kwan-woo
Park Ji-yeon as Lee Se-Hee
Kim Su-ro as teacher Cha 
Hwang Jung-eum as newcomer teacher Park Eun-su
Choi Ah-jin as Eom Ji-yun 
Kim Min-young as Min-jung
Kwon Hyun-sang as JK
Ji Chang-wook as Soo-il
Nam Bo-ra as Hyun-ah
Son Ho-jun as Jung-bum
Yoon Seung-ah as Jeong Tae-yeon
Park Eun-bin as Na-rae

Release
Death Bell 2: Bloody Camp was premiered at the Puchon International Fantastic Film Festival on July 23, 2010, where it was the festival's closing film. The film received wide release in South Korea on July 28, 2010.

While writing the script, it was suggested that the characters should solve their problems in a quiz show format like they did in the first film. Director Yoo Sun-dong was against this ideas as he felt it was too much of an imitation of the first film. Yoo was influenced by his own high school experiences, stating that "Authoritative teachers like Teacher Kang (played by Kim Byung-ok) and Teacher Cha (played by Kim Su-ro) or the competition and violence between the students were things that I saw and felt when I was in school. I tried to put such horrifying elements into the film."

Reception

Commercial success 
On wide-release, the film was a huge success with over 97,000 people seeing it in Korea on its opening day and around 300,000 people in its first 3 days. An official for the film said it was "four times what we expected".

The film was also pre-sold in Taiwan and Hong Kong for $230,000 at the 63rd Cannes International Film Festival Film Market.

Critical response 
The Hollywood Reporter wrote that the film was an "alarmingly brainless and sloppily directed follow-up to Death Bell"  noting that the only "scene worthy of attention is when student Jang-kook is stranded on a corridor and repeatedly attacked by a motorbike outfitted with revolving blades. It has the Gothic, apocalyptic taste of Mad Max." JoongAng Daily gave a negative review of the film, saying that "it should have taken more chances and offered audiences more than blood...the film won't do much for viewers who are die-hard slasher film fans". Despite negative reviews, both The Hollywood Reporter and JoongAng Daily praised the scene involving a metal-spiked motorcycle that attacks a student. Film Business Asia gave the film a seven out of ten rating saying that the film was a "dark, fast-moving gore feast, with less emphasis on puzzle countdowns but a richer plot than its predecessor".

Asian Economy credited Park Jiyeon, Eun-bin, Ji Chang-wook and Yoon Seung-ah as one of the factors for the movie's success praising their acting performance.

Accolades

References

External links
 
 
 고死 두 번째 이야기 : 교생실습 at Cine 21 (Korean)

2010 horror films
South Korean horror films
South Korean sequel films
Next Entertainment World films
2010s Korean-language films
2010 films
South Korean slasher films
2010s South Korean films